Tigerwood is a common name for lumber produced from several species of tropical trees:

 Lovoa trichilioides, a tree species found in Africa
 Gonçalo alves, several species found in Brazil:
Astronium fraxinifolium
Astronium graveolens
Astronium lecointei
 Erythrina standleyana and Erythrina rubrinervia, from northwest South America and Central America
 Microberlinia bisulcata, a tree in Cameroon

See also
 Tiger Woods (born 1975), an American professional golfer
 Tiger Woods (disambiguation)

Wood